Eschatotypa halosparta, also known as the salt and pepper fungus moth, is a species of moth in the family Tineidae. It was described by Edward Meyrick in 1919 from a specimen collected by George Vernon Hudson at Wainuiomata in December. This species is endemic to New Zealand. This species has also been collected near the Tui Mine in Te Aroha.

References

External links
Image of type specimen of Eschatotypa halosparta

Moths described in 1919
Tineidae
Moths of New Zealand
Endemic fauna of New Zealand
Taxa named by Edward Meyrick
Endemic moths of New Zealand